Bebearia warrengashi, or Warren-Gash's forester, is a butterfly in the family Nymphalidae. It is found in Ivory Coast. The habitat consists of forests.

Eponym
Bebearia warrengashi is named in honour of Haydon Warren-Gash.

References

Butterflies described in 2000
warrengashi
Endemic fauna of Ivory Coast
Butterflies of Africa